Bashir Ahmad Bezan is a citizen of Afghanistan who was a candidate in Afghanistan's 2009 Presidential elections.

Academic career

Bezan graduated from the Khwaja Abbdullah Ansari higher secondary school in 1992.
He subsequently enrolled in Kabul University's Journalism Department.

Journalistic career

Bezan was the founder and editor of the Cinna magazine, a weekly cultural magazine.
He served as the editor of the Parwaz magazine, the in-flight magazine of Ariana Airlines.
Immediately prior to the elections, he was the editor of Khabar Nigar.

Political career

Bezan founded the Kangara Afghanistan National Party.
He ranked 28th in a field of 38, with 1,272 votes.

References

1966 births
Living people
Afghan politicians
Afghan journalists